Ekalaka National Forest was established as the Ekalaka Forest Reserve in Montana on November 5, 1906, with a total area of . It became a National Forest on March 4, 1907. On July 1, 1908, it was absorbed by Sioux National Forest and the name was discontinued.

The forest today comprises the Ekalaka Hills unit of the Sioux Ranger District of Custer National Forest, in Carter County, southeast of Ekalaka.

See also
 List of forests in Montana

References

External links
Sioux Ranger District, Custer National Forest
Forest History Society
Listing of the National Forests of the United States and Their Dates (from the Forest History Society website) Text from Davis, Richard C., ed. Encyclopedia of American Forest and Conservation History. New York: Macmillan Publishing Company for the Forest History Society, 1983. Vol. II, pp. 743-788.

coordinates = 

Former National Forests of Montana
Protected areas of Carter County, Montana
1906 establishments in Montana